Rade Drainac (26 August 1899 – 1 May 1943) was a Serbian poet.

Biography
He was born on 26 August 1899 as Radojko Jovanović in Trbunje, a village in the municipality of Blace. He studied in Serbia and lived in Paris for a short period, where he played the violin during silent films projections. Drainac followed Serbian Army during the Great Retreat. He started writing poetry as a young man, with first volume of poetry published in 1921.

Besides writing poetry, Drainac worked as a journalist for several magazines, including Hipnos, Novo čovečanstvo, Front, Slike aktuelnih događaja and Nova brazda. As a reporter for Pravda, Drainac traveled extensively across the Balkans, Asia Minor and Russia, Austria, Latvia, France, Sweden, Greece, Romania, Poland and other countries.

He was well known as a bohemian, and a frequent visitor of Hotel Moskva.

During World War II he enlisted to fight, holding the rank of gefreiter. He was caught by Bulgarian army in 1941 and had spent a month in Crveni Krst concentration camp. Drainac pretended to be a Bulgarian and managed to get a release. Upon returning home, he found that his personal library with more than one thousand volumes had been burned down. Severely sick, Drainac died in 1943 in a state hospital in Belgrade.

Literary historian Jovan Deretić described Drainac as "poet of the city" and wrote affirmatively about his work.

National library in Prokuplje, several cultural institutions across country, a school in Belgrade and several streets in Serbia are named after him.

In 1998 Rade Drainac Award for Poetry was established in his honour and his bust can be found in Skadarlija and Prokuplje.

He was influenced by Miloš Crnjanski and Rastko Petrović.

Works

 Modri smeh, Belgrade, 1921
 Afroditin vrt, Prokuplje, 1921
 Erotikon, Belgrade, 1923
 Voz odlazi, Belgrade 1923
 Dve avanturističke poeme, Belgrade, 1926
 Lirske minijature, Skoplje, 1926
 Bandit ili pesnik, Belgrade, 1928
 Srce na pazaru, Belgrade, 1929
 Španski zid. Naša ljubav, Belgrade, 1930
 Banket, Belgrade, 1930
 Rasvetljenje, Belgrade, 1934
 Dragoljub Jovanović ili seljački Napoleon, Belgrade, 1935
 Uzurpatori (Uzunović, Jevtić i V. Popović), Belgrade, 1935
 Ulis, Belgrade, 1938
 Osvrti, Belgrade, 1938
 Čovek peva, Belgrade, 1938
 Dah zemlje, Belgrade, 1940
 Crni dani, Belgrade, 1963
 Azil za beskućnike ili univerzalna radionica mrtvačkih sanduka Rusin a. d.
 Ja ne žalim što sam voleo i patio, 1987
 Plamen u pustinji, Belgrade, 1993
 Works of Rade Drainac, I–X, Belgrade, 1998–1999

References

Further reading
Srpski pesnici između dva rata by Borislav Mihajlović Mihiz, 1956
Drainac pesnik i boem by Siniša Paunović, 1981

1899 births
1943 deaths
20th-century Serbian writers
20th-century non-fiction writers
Serbian male writers
Serbian male poets
Serbian non-fiction writers
Poètes maudits
Burials at Belgrade New Cemetery
Male non-fiction writers
Royal Yugoslav Army personnel of World War II
Yugoslav prisoners of war